Red Dead Redemption 2 is a Western-themed 2018 action-adventure game developed and published by Rockstar Games. A prequel to the 2010 game Red Dead Redemption, the game is set in 1899 in a fictionalized representation of the Western, Midwestern and Southern United States and follows outlaw Arthur Morgan, a member of the Van der Linde gang. Arthur must deal with the decline of the Wild West whilst attempting to survive against government forces, rival gangs, and other enemies. The game was announced on October 18, 2016, and was widely anticipated. It was nominated for Most Anticipated Game at The Game Awards in 2016 and 2017, and for Most Wanted Game at the Golden Joystick Awards.

The game was released worldwide on October 26, 2018, for the PlayStation 4 and Xbox One consoles. Red Dead Redemption 2 received "universal acclaim" from critics, according to review aggregator Metacritic; it was Metacritic's highest-rated game of 2018. The game had the largest opening weekend in the history of entertainment, making over $725 million in three days, and selling over 17 million copies in two weeks. Additionally, Red Dead Redemption 2 is the second highest-grossing entertainment launch (behind Grand Theft Auto V) and set records for largest ever pre-orders, largest first-day sales and largest sales for the first three days in market on PlayStation Network.

Red Dead Redemption 2 garnered awards and nominations in a variety of categories with particular praise for its story, performances, music, and graphical design. At The Game Awards 2018, the game received eight nominations and went on to win four awards: Best Audio Design, Best Narrative, Best Score/Music, and Best Performance for Roger Clark as Arthur Morgan. At IGN Best of 2018, the game garnered seven nominations; it won two awards and was named runner-up in four (behind God of War). The game earned eight nominations at the 22nd Annual D.I.C.E. Awards, including Game of the Year. At the 6th SXSW Gaming Awards, Red Dead Redemption 2 was named the Trending Game of the Year and won for Excellence in SFX and Technical Achievement. The game received seven nominations at the 19th Game Developers Choice Awards, and six at the 15th British Academy Games Awards.

The game also appeared on several year-end lists of the best games of 2018, receiving Game of the Year wins at the Australian Games Awards, Brazil Game Awards, Fun & Serious Game Festival, IGN Australia Select Awards, and Italian Video Game Awards, and from outlets such as 4Players, AusGamers, Complex, Digital Trends, Edge, Electronic Gaming Monthly, Gamereactor, GameSpot, The Guardian, Hot Press, news.com.au, The Telegraph, USgamer, and Vulture; it was named runner-up by several other publications. The game was named among the best games of the 2010s by Entertainment.ie, The Hollywood Reporter, Metacritic, National Post, NME, Stuff, Thrillist, VG247, and Wired UK. Red Dead Redemption 2 was ranked among the best games of its generation by Game Informer, GamesRadar+, and IGN.

Accolades

Notes

References 



Red Dead Redemption 2
Red Dead Redemption 2